Victor Ohman may refer to:

Victor Öhman (born 1992), Swedish ice hockey player
Victor Öhman (ice hockey, born 1995), Swedish ice hockey player